The Minister for Publicity was a position in the Ministry of Dáil Éireann, the government of the Irish Republic, a self-declared state which was established in 1919 by Dáil Éireann, the parliamentary assembly made up of the majority of Irish MPs elected in the 1918 general election.

History
In April 1918, a Sinn Féin Department of Propaganda was established at No. 6 Harcourt Street in charge of Robert Brennan. The portfolio was created to promote the new government of Ireland throughout the country. After the First Dáil came into being a similar department was set up under the new Dáil, concentrating more on overseas publicity. Both Departments co-operated in issuing publicity material. The first Director of Publicity under Dáil Éireann was Laurence Ginnell.

In the First Dáil, the post was called Director of Propaganda.

List of office-holders

References

Publicity
Publicity